Stefano Pesoli (born February 29, 1984) is an Italian footballer.

Career

Europe
Pesoli began his career in the youth system of the famed Serie A club AS Roma, but never played for the first team; he spent the majority of his early career in the Italian lower leagues, playing for Viterbese, Calangianus, Pro Vasto, Monterotondo, Rieti and Melfi.

North America
Pesoli signed for Montreal Impact in the USL First Division in 2008, and on December 2, 2008 Impact announced the re-signing of central defenders Nevio Pizzolitto and Pesoli to a two-year contracts. On July 8, 2010, he was released by the Montreal Impact.

Honors

Montreal Impact
USL First Division Championship (1): 2009

References

External links
Montreal Impact bio

1984 births
Living people
People from Anagni
U.S. Viterbese 1908 players
Vastese Calcio 1902 players
Expatriate soccer players in Canada
Association football defenders
Italian expatriate footballers
Italian expatriate sportspeople in Canada
Italian footballers
Montreal Impact (1992–2011) players
USL First Division players
USSF Division 2 Professional League players
A.S. Melfi players
Pol. Monterotondo Lupa players
Footballers from Lazio
Sportspeople from the Province of Frosinone